Kalani Brooke Hilliker (born September 23, 2000) is an American dancer and actress. She rose to fame in 2013 as a contestant on the Lifetime reality series Abby's Ultimate Dance Competition and subsequently appeared on Dance Moms, becoming a regular cast member from 2014 to 2017.

Life and career
Hilliker was born on September 23, 2000 in Mesa, Arizona to Kira Girard (née Salazar) and Matthew Hilliker. She has two younger half-brothers, Jax and Jett, and one younger half-sister, Kaliah—all of whom are through her mother. In October 2019, Hilliker moved to Los Angeles. However, in January 2021, she announced on her YouTube channel that she left L.A., and now lives in Scottsdale, Arizona. Hilliker started dancing at the age of two. Her mother initially enrolled her in dance classes because she thought it would be fun to dress her daughter up. Hilliker started training at Club Dance in Mesa at age 5. As a child, she was an avid soccer player, but decided to pursue dance more committedly around age 9 and got an agent. She began ballet training at the Master Ballet Academy in Arizona at the age of 10. In 2011, Hilliker and several of her dance friends entered Disney Channel's Make Your Mark Ultimate Dance Off contest, vying for the prize of a featured role on the hit show Shake It Up. Her group, AKsquared, won the competition, and was featured in the Shake It Up episode "Camp It Up." She aspired at this time to be a backup dancer for Katy Perry or Beyonce. In 2013, Hilliker became a series dance regular on the ABC Family show Bunheads, appearing in multiple episodes as Baby Bun. That same year, she took part in Lifetime's Abby's Ultimate Dance Competition, a dance reality competition series. Hilliker made it to the final four, finishing in fourth place. Following her top four finish, Hilliker and her mother were invited by Abby Lee Miller to join the cast of Dance Moms and to replace Brooke and Paige Hyland on the Abby Lee Dance Company team. They first appeared in the season four episode "Big Trouble in the Big Apple." While originally brought on as a guest dancer and after several weeks with the ALDC in season 4, Hilliker became a permanent member of the team at the beginning of the competition season during season five. She danced as part of the ALDC until the second half of the seventh season, when she left to form "The Irreplaceables" with Nia Frazier, Kendall Vertes, Chloe Lukasiak, and Camryn Bridges, which was led by Dancing with the Stars alum Cheryl Burke. Following the season finale, she left the show entirely. In December 2017, after the seventh season of Dance Moms wrapped, Hilliker, Kendall, Chloe, and Nia started The Irreplaceables Tour, holding workshops and dancing in cities across North America and abroad. In 2018, she began starring on the web series Dirt. Hilliker has placed in the top three at The Dance Awards for six years, winning Junior Female Best Dancer in 2013. Currently, Hilliker has a sock line called "Pretty Feet by Kalani", which is sold at Claire's. She also has a prom dress collection, which she helped design in partnership with PromGirl. 

In July 2020, Hilliker was photographed with a Blue Lives Matter flag. Then, in November 2020, she publicly announced that she would be supporting Donald Trump's presidential campaign in the 2020 United States presidential election.

Filmography

Films

Television and web

Music videos

Awards and nominations

References

External links

2000 births
Living people
21st-century American actresses
Actresses from Phoenix, Arizona
American child actresses
American female dancers
American people of Basque descent
American television actresses
Arizona Republicans
Participants in American reality television series
People from Mesa, Arizona